The following is a list of Breña District, Lima province, Peru's mayors in the 20th and 21st centuries:

 Luis B. Nicolini Peschiera (1949–1955)
 Juan Rissi Manfredi (1956–1962)
 Roberto Rubín Hudson (1962–1963)
 Fabio de la Torre Neyra (1963)
 Carlos Salazar Beraún (1964–1969)
 Víctor Graham Morales (1970–1976)
 Aurelio del Corral Salcedo (1977–1979)
 Pedro Villanueva Calderón (1979–1980)
 Alfredo Swayne de la Cruz (1981–1983)
 Luis A. Suito Tuesta (1984–1986)
 Rodolfo Galván Montoya (1987–1989)
 Rolando Velasco Vásquez (1990–1992)
 Juan José Gonzales Saldaña (1993–1995)
 Carlos Salazar Beraún (1996–1998)
 Carlos Sandoval Blancas (1999–2006)
 José Gordillo Abad (2007–2010)
 José Gordillo Abad (2011–2014)
 Angel Wu (2015–2018)

Brena